Louis Christian August Glass (23 March 1864 – 22 January 1936) was a Danish composer.

Glass, born in Copenhagen, was an almost exact contemporary of Carl Nielsen and, like Nielsen, was a student of Niels Gade. However, Glass also studied at the Brussels Conservatory, where he became enamored of the music of César Franck and Anton Bruckner, both of whom stylistically influenced his writing. For several years, he was one of Denmark's leading concert pianists until a paralysis in one arm made him retire from the stage. He then devoted himself primarily to composing. He composed in most genres and wrote several chamber music works of worth, including four string quartets, a string sextet, a piano trio, a piano quintet and several instrumental sonatas.

He wrote six symphonies (1893–1926), which have been recorded on the Danacord and CPO record labels, while some chamber music has been recorded on Da Capo.

Glass died in Copenhagen.

Symphonies
 Symphony No. 1 in E-major, Op. 17 (1894)
 Symphony No. 2 in C-minor, Op. 28 (1899)
 Symphony No. 3 in D-major, Op. 30 "Forest symphony" (1901)
 Symphony No. 4 in E-minor, Op. 43 (1911)
 Symphony No. 5 in C-major, Op. 57 "Sinfonia Svastika" (1919) - Note on the title: This work celebrates the swastika as a Vedic good fortune or Sun symbol.  At the time of composition in 1918-1919, the Nazi movement had not been established.
 Symphony No. 6 "Skjoldungeæt" (The Birth of Scyldings), Op.60 (1924)

References

 Cobbett's Cyclopedic Survey of Chamber Music, Ed. Cobbett, W.W., Oxford University Press, 1929 & 1963, London. 
 Some of the information on this page appears on the website of Edition Silvertrust but permission has been granted to copy, distribute and/or modify this document under the terms of the GNU Free Documentation License.

External links

Louis Glass String Sextet soundbites and discussion of work
First editions by AlbisMusic
Detailed curriculum vitae (german).

1864 births
1936 deaths
19th-century classical composers
19th-century male musicians
20th-century classical composers
20th-century Danish male musicians
Danish classical composers
Danish classical pianists
Danish male classical composers
Danish Romantic composers
Male classical pianists
Musicians from Copenhagen
Pupils of Niels Gade